Park Ridge is a suburb in the City of Logan, Queensland, Australia.

Geography
Park Ridge lies to Logan's west and enjoys a rural setting. There are acreage properties buffered by bushland.   Part of the suburb's western boundary is marked by the Mount Lindesay Highway.

History
Logan Ridges was the original name for the suburb of Park Ridges. This was until the early 1890s, when the post office changed its name to reflect the park-like nature of the area.

Early settlers hailed from Yorkshire and timber-getting and farming were the primary industries during the 1890s and remained important through to the early 20th century, when tobacco growing was taken on. Success was fleeting and eventually poultry farming came to the fore; Ingham's Chickens becoming a major employer.

Park Ridge Provisional School opened on 23 April 1895 located between Rosia Road and Hillcrest Road; it became a state school on 1 January 1909. Unfortunately, the building did not have ant caps on the stumps and eventually the white ants damaged the building. In 1915, the school relocated to its present site where the (then) disused Browns Plains Provision School had been relocated.

Park Ridge State High School opened on 29 January 1991.

In 1996, the population of Park Ridge  was 1,549 people. 71% of the homes in Park Ridge were owner-occupied.  

It is affiliated with the Society of St Pius X.

Parklands Christian College opened on 11 April 2001.

In 2001 the population was 1,745 showing a population growth of 13% in the area during that time. The predominant age group in Park Ridge is 50 – 59 years. 70% of homes in Park Ridge were owner-occupied. Households in Park Ridge are primarily couples with children and are likely to be repaying between $1000.00 - $1200.00 per month on mortgage repayments. In general, people in Park Ridge work in a professional occupation.

The median age of the Park Ridge population was 54 years, 17 years above the national median of 37. 62.1% of people living in Park Ridge were born in Australia. The other top responses for country of birth were England 9.8%, New Zealand 5.2%, Taiwan 4.1%, Scotland 1.4%, Netherlands 1.3%. 80.8% of people spoke only English at home; the next most common languages were 5.6% Mandarin, 1.2% Vietnamese, 0.8% Dutch, 0.6% German, 0.6% Slovak.

Education
Park Ridge State School is a government primary (Prep-6) school for boys and girls at 3776 Mt Lindesay Highway. In 2017, the school had an enrolment of 577 students with  43 teachers (38 full-time equivalent) and 28 non-teaching staff (17 full-time equivalent). It includes a special education program.

Saint Philomena School is a private primary and secondary (Prep-12) school for boys and girls at 61-71 Koplick Road. In 2017, the school had an enrolment of 171 students with  16 teachers (15 full-time equivalent) and 9 non-teaching staff (6 full-time equivalent).

Parklands Christian College is a private primary and secondary (Prep-12) school for boys and girls at 11 Hillcrest Road. In 2017, the school had an enrolment of 654 students with  44 teachers (40 full-time equivalent) and 60 non-teaching staff (44 full-time equivalent).

Park Ridge State High School is a government secondary (7-12) school for boys and girls at 14-30 Lancewood Street. In 2017, the school had an enrolment of 1176 students with  98 teachers (96 full-time equivalent) and 60 non-teaching staff (41 full-time equivalent). It includes a special education program.

Amenities 
There are a number of parks in the area:

 Hubner Park
 Park Ridge District Park

See also

 Browns Plains

References

External links

 

Localities in Queensland